Linda Gillard lives in the Scottish Highlands and has been an actress, journalist and teacher. She is the author of seven novels, including STAR GAZING, short-listed in 2009 for Romantic Novel of the Year and HOUSE OF SILENCE, which became a Kindle bestseller and was selected by Amazon UK as one of their Top Ten Best of 2011 in the Indie Author category.

External links
 Author's website

Year of birth missing (living people)
Living people
Place of birth missing (living people)
Alumni of the University of Bristol